Premio Lo Nuestro 2005 nominees were announced during a press conference on December 2, 2004, at the American Airlines Arena in Miami, Florida. The hottest names in Latin music make up the list of nominees for the longest running and most popular Latin music award program in the U.S.

Host
Eugenio Derbez

Performers
 Paulina Rubio
 Alejandro Sanz
 David Bisbal
 Chayanne
 Don Omar
 Los Horóscopos de Durango
 Daddy Yankee — "Gasolina" 
 Julieta Venegas
 Los Tigres del Norte

Presenters

Special awards

Lifetime Achievement Award
 Los Temerarios

Legendary Young Artist Award
 Paulina Rubio

Pop

Album of the Year
 Abrazar la Vida - Luis Fonsi
 De Viaje -  Sin Bandera
 Pau-Latina - Paulina Rubio
 Seducción - Jennifer Peña
 Stop - Franco de Vita

Male Artist
 Chayanne
 Luis Fonsi
 Obie Bermúdez
 Ricky Martin

Female Artist
 Ednita Nazario
 Jennifer Peña
 Paulina Rubio
 Thalía

Group or Duo
 Aleks Syntek & Ana Torroja
 Andy & Lucas
 La Oreja de Van Gogh
 Sin Bandera

Song of the Year
 "Cuidarte el alma" - Chayanne
 "Que lloro" - Sin Bandera
 "Rosas", La Oreja de Van Gogh
 "Te quise tanto" - Paulina Rubio
 "Y todo queda en nada" - Ricky Martin

Best New Soloist or Group of the Year
 Andy & Lucas
 Ha*Ash
 Kalimba Marichal
 Negros

Rock

Album of the Year
 Atlas - Kinky
 Esenciales: Luna - Maná
 Rocanlover - Zoé
 Sí - Julieta Venegas
 Trippin Tropicana - Superlitio

Artist of the Year
 Juanes
 Julieta Venegas
 Kinky
 Maná

Tropical

Album of the Year
 Indetenibles - Toros Band
 Love & Hate - Aventura
 Mi tentación - Rey Ruiz
 Travesía - Víctor Manuelle
 Valió la Pena - Marc Anthony

Male Artist of the Year
 Jerry Rivera
 Marc Anthony
 Rey Ruiz
 Víctor Manuelle

Female Artist of the Year
 Celia Cruz
 Gloria Estefan
 La India
 Melina León

Group or Duo of the Year
 Aventura
 Grupo Manía
 Son de Cali
 Toros Band

Song of the Year
 "Ahora quién" - Marc Anthony
 "Creo en el amor" - Rey Ruiz
 "Lloré lloré" - Víctor Manuelle
 "Loca conmigo" - Toros Band
 "Tengo ganas" - Víctor Manuelle

Merengue Artist of the Year
 Elvis Crespo
 Grupo Manía
 Limi-T 21
 Toros Band

Tropical Salsa Artist of the Year
 Jerry Rivera
 Marc Anthony
 Rey Ruiz
 Víctor Manuelle

Tropical Traditional Artist of the Year
 Aventura
 Andy Andy
 Carlos Vives
 Elvis Martinez

Best New Soloist or Group of the Year
 Domenic Marte
 El Florido Flores
 Luna Llena
 N'Klabe

Regional Mexican Music

Album of the Year
 Simplemente - Intocable
 Locos de amor - Los Horóscopos de Durango
 Pacto De Sangre - Los Tigres del Norte
 Por ti - Banda el Recodo
 Que amarren a Cupido - Joan Sebastian

Male Artist of the Year
 Adán Chalino
 Joan Sebastian
 Marco Antonio Solís
 Pepe Aguilar

Female Artist of the Year
 Alicia Villarreal
 Mariana Seoane
 Ninel Conde
 Paquita la del Barrio

Group or Duo of the Year
 Banda el Recodo
 Conjunto Primavera
 Montez de Durango
 Los Tigres del Norte

Song of the Year
 "Dos locos" - Los Horóscopos de Durango
 "Hazme olvidarla" - Conjunto Primavera
 "Lágrimas de cristal" - Montez de Durango
 "Más Que Tu Amigo" - Marco Antonio Solís
 "Te quise olvidar" - Montez de Durango

Banda of the Year
 Banda el Recodo
 Cuisillos
 Los Horóscopos de Durango
 Montez de Durango

Grupera Artist of the Year
 Alicia Villarreal
 Bronco El Gigante de América
 Joan Sebastian
 Los Temerarios

Norteño Artist of the Year
 Conjunto Primavera
 Intocable
 Palomo
 Los Tigres del Norte

Ranchera Artist of the Year
 Marco Antonio Solís
 Paquita la del Barrio
 Pepe Aguilar
 Vicente Fernández

Best New Artist or Group of the Year
 Grupo Climax
 Juan Tavares
 Kris Melody
 Mariana Seoane

Urban

Album of the Year
 Barrio Fino - Daddy Yankee
 DJ Kane - DJ Kane
 La Verdad - Fulanito
 The Last Don Live - Don Omar
 Uno, Dos: Bandera - Control Machete

Artist of the Year
 Control Machete
 Don Omar
 Fulanito
 Yolanda Pérez

Video of the Year
 "Try to Save Your S’ong" - Alejandro Sanz
 "Bulería" - David Bisbal
 Santa María - Gotan Project
 "Lágrimas" - JD Natasha
 "Ahora quién" - Marc Anthony
 "Te quise tanto" - Paulina Rubio

References

External links
Premio lo Nuestro Official Site
 Premio Lo Nuestro Press Release Nominees from Univision.net 

Lo Nuestro Awards by year
2005 music awards
2005 in Florida
2005 in Latin music
2000s in Miami